In Greek mythology, Pylaon (Ancient Greek: Πυλάων) was a prince of Pylos and son of King Neleus by Chloris, daughter of King Amphion of Orchomenus. He was the brother to Pero, Taurus, Asterius, Evagoras, Deimachus, Eurybius, Epilaus, Phrasius, Eurymenes, Alastor, Nestor and Periclymenus.

Mythology 
Along with his father and other brothers, except Nestor, Pylaon was killed by Heracles during the sack of Pylos.

Notes

References 

 Homer, The Odyssey with an English Translation by A.T. Murray, Ph.D. in two volumes. Cambridge, MA., Harvard University Press; London, William Heinemann, Ltd. 1919. Online version at the Perseus Digital Library. Greek text available from the same website.
 Pseudo-Apollodorus, The Library with an English Translation by Sir James George Frazer, F.B.A., F.R.S. in 2 Volumes, Cambridge, MA, Harvard University Press; London, William Heinemann Ltd. 1921. . Online version at the Perseus Digital Library. Greek text available from the same website.

Princes in Greek mythology
Neleides
Pylian characters in Greek mythology